Osawaru Odighizuwa (born August 13, 1998) is an American football defensive tackle for the Dallas Cowboys of the National Football League (NFL). He was drafted by the Cowboys in the third round of the 2021 NFL Draft. He played college football at UCLA, where he was a first-team all-conference selection in the Pac-12.

Early years 
Odighizuwa attended David Douglas High School. He was a two-time defensive player of the year and received PrepStar All-West honors as a senior. He was a three star recruit coming out of high school and committed to play college at the University of California, Los Angeles on May 5, 2015.

He lettered in wrestling, where he won three straight state heavyweight championships. He was undefeated in his last two years (46-0 and 45-0). He also practiced track for one season.

College career 
As a redshirt freshman, he appeared in all 13 games as a backup defensive tackle. He collected 15 tackles, 5.5 tackles for loss (tied for fifth on the team) and one sack. He had 3 tackles and one sack against the University of Oregon. He returned a fumble for a 51-yard touchdown against the University of Washington. He made 2 tackles for loss and one sack against the University of Hawai'i.

As a sophomore, he appeared in 11 games, starting at defensive tackle in the final 8. He registered 29 tackles, 3 sacks (tied for second on the team), 6 tackles for loss (tied for third on the team) and 2 pass breakups. He had 5 tackles against the University of Colorado and the University of Washington.

As a junior, he was named the starter at defensive tackle. He tallied 46 tackles (fifth on the team), 3.5 sacks (third on the team) and 10 tackles for loss (tied for the team lead). He had 9 tackles against San Diego State University.

As a senior, the football season was reduced to 7 games due to the COVID-19 pandemic. He was a starter at defensive tackle, posting 30 tackles (sixth on the team), 4 sacks (second on the team) and 6 tackles for loss (third on the team). He had 6 tackles against the University of Colorado and Arizona State University. He made 2.5 tackles against the University of California. He received first-team All-Pac-12 honors. On December 22, 2020, he announced his intentions to enter the 2021 NFL Draft.

Professional career 

Odighizuwa was selected by the Dallas Cowboys in the third round (75th overall) of the 2021 NFL Draft. He signed his four-year rookie contract with Dallas on June 10, 2021.

2021 season: Rookie year

Heading into his first training camp in the NFL, Odighizuwa was listed as a starting defensive tackle on the Cowboys' training camp depth chart alongside veteran Neville Gallimore.  He faced competition from Trysten Hill and Chauncey Golston for his starting job.  At the conclusion of the NFL preseason, head coach Mike McCarthy officially named Odighizuwa a starting defensive tackle.   

Odighizuwa made his first career start and NFL debut in the Cowboys' Week 1 loss to the Tampa Bay Buccaneers.  He had a quiet debut, recording just one assist in the loss.  Odighizuwa was relatively quiet for the first two games of the season, but he had an excellent game in Week 3 against the Philadelphia Eagles.  In that game, Odighizuwa recorded his first career sack on quarterback Jalen Hurts, and posted 1.5 sacks, two solo tackles, and a tackle for loss during the 41-21 win.  Odighizuwa posted another 0.5 sack, two more solo tackles, and another tackle for loss the following week in a 36-28 victory over the Carolina Panthers.  Odighizuwa recorded his third straight tackle for loss in a Week 5 victory against the New York Giants.  In a 30-16 loss in Week 9 against the Denver Broncos, Odighizuwa recorded his fourth career tackle for loss.  In a 27-17 Week 13 victory against the New Orleans Saints, Odighizuwa recorded four solo tackles and two tackles for a loss.  

Overall, Odighizuwa finished his rookie season appearing in 16 games (12 starts) and recorded 21 solo tackles, 6 tackles for loss, 11 QB hits, and two sacks on the season.  He played in 57% of the Cowboys' defensive snaps during the season.

Career Statistics

Personal life 
His older brother Owa Odighizuwa played as a defensive end in the NFL.

Odighizuwa's father, Peter, was the perpetrator of the 2002 Appalachian School of Law shooting, in which three were killed and three were wounded.

References

External links 
UCLA Bruins bio

1998 births
Living people
American sportspeople of Nigerian descent
American football defensive tackles
Players of American football from Portland, Oregon
UCLA Bruins football players
Dallas Cowboys players